Syntaxin-binding protein 5 is a protein that in humans is encoded by the STXBP5 gene. It is also known as tomosyn, after , "friend" in Japanese, for its role as a binding protein.

Function 

Syntaxin 1 is a component of the 7S and 20S SNARE complexes which are involved in docking and fusion of synaptic vesicles with the presynaptic plasma membrane. This gene encodes a syntaxin 1 binding protein. In rat, a similar protein dissociates syntaxin 1 from the Munc18/n-Sec1/rbSec1 complex to form a 10S complex, an intermediate which can be converted to the 7S SNARE complex. Thus this protein is thought to be involved in neurotransmitter release by stimulating SNARE complex formation. Alternatively spliced variants have been identified, but their biological validity has not been determined.

Positional cloning suggested that tomosyn might inhibit neurotransmitter secretion in Caenorhabditis elegans neurons.] This hypothesis was tested and confirmed, showing that tomosyn specifically inhibits synaptic vesicle priming—the biochemical step immediately preceding vesicle fusion and neurotransmitter release.

Structure 
Two functional domains were originally identified, including one which binds to syntaxin, but recent crystallization of the yeast homolog Sro7 revealed that tomosyn likely has three functional domains: one WD40 domain and one syntaxin-binding domain, as previously recognized, but also another WD40 domain. The study also suggested that tomosyn's 'syntaxin binding domain' is not the reason tomosyn is inhibitory for neurotransmitter release, as originally proposed. The Sro7-based structure is currently given on SWISS-MODEL, which includes the WD40 domains but not most of the coiled coil syntaxin-binding domain seen in the infobox.

Interactions 

STXBP5 has been shown to interact with STX4 and STX1A.

References

Further reading 

 
 
 

Proteins